This is a list of episodes of the 2008 animated television series . The anime is based on the manga of the same name, and is produced by SynergySP. It began on April 6, 2008 on TV Tokyo.

The anime has six pieces of theme music; two opening themes and four ending themes. From episode 27 onwards opening theme has changed to "MY WINGS", once again by Karen Girl's, ending theme changed to "Break+Your+Destiny" by Yuuichi Nakamura, Kishō Taniyama and Kōji Yusa and "Soushunfu" performed by Aya Hirano, Ryoko Shiraishi and Haruka Tomatsu. In episode 46 of the series, the opening theme, "MY WINGS", was sung by Aya Hirano, Ryoko Shiraishi and Haruka Tomatsu while the ending theme was "Zettai love×love Sengen!!", sung by Karen Girl's. The series has been licensed by Sentai Filmworks and was released under the title Psychic Squad on North America in 2012.

Episode list

References

External links
Anime official website 

Zettai Karen Children